The Heller was a Canadian antitank rocket launcher produced and fielded in 1954, replaced by M20 "Super Bazooka" and Carl-Gustaf recoilless rifle after 1967.

Description

The Heller was in production from 1954 and remained in service until 1967. It replaced the US Bazooka, providing both longer range and greatly increased penetration. It was in turn replaced by the US M20 "Super Bazooka" which had even higher performance and somewhat simpler setup, and these were in turn replaced by the 84-mm MAW.

Manual view

From manual:

Length of launcher: 54 inches

Weight of launcher tube and tripod:  approx. 28.5lbs

Weight of rangefinder sight: approx. 5 lbs

HE A tk rocket penetration (homogeneous armour): over 11 inches at 90 degrees, Approx. 5 Inches at 64 degrees angle of strike.
 

Max range: 2,860 yards

Opening range (first round hit): 300 yards

Maximum effective range: 450 yards

Muzzle velocity: 715 feet per second.

Max rate of fire: 5 rounds per minute.

Citations and sources

 Weeks, John. Men against tanks: a history of anti-tank warfare, Newton Abbot : David and Charles, 1975. .

Anti-tank rockets
Weapons of Canada